The Three Ws Oval (Most commonly styled '3Ws Oval') is a cricket field at the entrance of the Cave Hill Campus of the University of the West Indies in Barbados.  Mostly known for the sculpture in the shape of three large wickets that stand tall on the incline above the field, the 3Ws Oval was one of the team warm-up venues for the 2007 Cricket World Cup finals, which were played at the nearby Kensington Oval stadium.  The 3Ws has undergone a huge redevelopment over the last four years to meet ICC standards.

Found situated next to the 3Ws Oval are the dormitories, the  CLR James Centre for Cricket Research and the basketball courts at the University's campus entrance. Leading up the hill from the cricket ground is the West Indies Cricket Walk of Fame which leads up the gravesites of Sir Frank Worrell and Sir Clyde Walcott

In the park opposite the University, you will find a monument in the shape of a 'W' with busts of each of the famous 3Ws – Sir Frank Worrell, Sir Clyde Walcott and Sir Everton Weekes. These three giants of cricket were all born within a few miles of each other in Barbados and became a fearsome batting trio for the West Indies. All three were later knighted for their service to cricket.
The facilities at the 3Ws Oval also includes an indoor cricket school which hosts the Sagicor West Indies High Performance Centre (HPC) which was opened in June 2010. The university's cricket teams also call this picturesque ground home for first-class cricket, List A cricket and local club cricket.

See also

University of the West Indies
University of the West Indies cricket team

References

External links
University of the West Indies - Cave Hill campus website
Photos and info. on 3Ws monument

Cricket grounds in Barbados
Saint Michael, Barbados
University of the West Indies